Virgil's Root Beer is an American brand of root beer that originated in the United States. The root beer was created in 1994 by Edward Crowley and Jill Fraser Crowley, owners of Crowley Beverage Company.

In 1999, Reed's Inc. purchased the Virgil's Root Beer brand from the Crowley Beverage Company.

Flavors 
Virgil's Root Beer contains a blend of spices that includes anise, licorice, vanilla, cinnamon, cloves, nutmeg, wintergreen, cassia oil, pimento berry oil, and balsam oil.

In 1999, Virgil's started making vanilla cream, black cherry, orange, lemon-lime, and cola flavors. In 2018, the company made a zero-sugar product based on a sweetener blend containing erythritol, stevia, and monkfruit.

In Popular Culture 
In 2014, the brewing and bottling process of Virgil's Root Beer was presented on season 3 episode 18 of the Biography Channel's Food Factory, titled "A Taste of Japan."

Lawsuit 
On November 19, 2018, a class action lawsuit was filled against Reed's Inc., doing business as Virgil's Soda, alleging that the soda brand falsely labels products as preservative free. The plaintiff alleges that the all natural, preservative free labeling on Virgil's Root Beer and Virgil's Orange Cream Soda is fraudulent as they contain citric acid which is a synthetic compound used as a preservative. The U.S. Food and Drug Administration (FDA) regulations have designated citric acid as a preservative. The plaintiff notes a previous FDA citation against Chiquita for falsely claiming a product as preservative-free when it contained citric acid.

References 

American soft drinks
Root beer
1994 introductions